Joseph Weiß (born 1486 or 1487; died 1565) was a German Renaissance painter.

Weiss was born and died in Balingen.  He came from a family of painters: his father, Marx Weiß the Elder (died 1518), and brother, Marx Weiß the Younger, were also painters. It is possible that he is the true identity of the anonymous painter known as the Master of Meßkirch.

References
Heidrun Bucher-Schlichtenberger: Künstlerspuren in Balingen in 750 Jahre Stadt Balingen, Balingen, 2005, p. 454-455
Eckart Hannmann: Die Balinger Malerfamilie Weiß (15./16. Jhd.) in Der Zollernalbkreis 2nd revised edition, Stuttgart, 1989, p. 218-219
Anna Moraht-Fromm and Hans Westhoff: Der Meister von Meßkirch, Forschungen zur südwestdeutschen Malerei des 16. Jahrhunderts, Ulm, 1997
Hans Rott: Quellen und Forschungen zur südwestdeutschen und schweizerischen Kunstgeschichte im 15. und 16. Jahrhundert, Stuttgart, 1833

16th-century German painters
German male painters
1480s births
1565 deaths
Year of birth uncertain